Australian Banking & Finance Magazine is a trade magazine of the Australian banking and finance community, providing coverage of the financial services sector, with a 30,000-strong readership.

It is produced by Australian Financial Publications, an Australian financial industry media company that produce, manage and deliver magazines, conferences, forums, briefings and custom and online communications.

The magazine is published monthly in print format, with eleven editions a year. A daily online newsletter was established in 2010 providing coverage of day-to-day events in the banking and finance industry.

References

External links
 

1992 establishments in Australia
Business magazines published in Australia
Monthly magazines published in Australia
Magazines established in 1992
Professional and trade magazines